Quiet Nights is an album by English multi-instrumentalist and composer, Django Bates. It was released on the Screwgun label in 1998.

Reception
Allmusic awarded the album with 4.5 out of 5 stars and its review by Thom Jurek states: "Bates and his band have taken these old warhorses and made them magical again, brought out the starlight and glitter and tossed it about the melodies, stretched the harmonies into cloud shapes, and added enough atmosphere and dimension to make Gil Evans smile from heaven."

Track listing
 "Speak Low" (Ogden Nash, Kurt Weill) – 9:14
 "Teach Me Tonight" (Sammy Cahn, Gene de Paul) – 3:15
 "And the Mermaid Laughed" (Iain Ballamy, Django Bates) – 3:21
 "Quiet Nights of Quiet Stars" (Antonio Carlos Jobim, Gene Lees) – 3:14
 "Hi-Lili, Hi-Lo" (Helen Deutsch, Bronisław Kaper) – 4:06
 "(In My) Solitude" (Eddie DeLange, Duke Ellington, Eddie DeLange) – 5:10
 "Like Someone in Love" (Johnny Burke, Jimmy Van Heusen) – 3:43
 "Is There Anyone Up There?" (Bates) – 6:10
 "Over the Rainbow" (Harold Arlen, Yip Harburg) – 6:36

Personnel
Django Bates – keyboards, tenor horn, voices
Iain Ballamy – saxophone, harmonica
Josefine Cronholm – vocals, voices, Tibetan bells
Mike Mondesir – bass
Martin France – drums, percussion

References

1998 albums
Django Bates albums
Screwgun Records albums